Barlybagh (known as Nizami until 1994) is a village in the municipality of Garabaghlar in the Shamkir District of Azerbaijan.

References

Populated places in Shamkir District